Héctor Abaunza (born 6 September 1938) is a Mexican fencer. He competed in the individual and team foil and team sabre events at the 1968 Summer Olympics.

References

External links
 

1938 births
Living people
Mexican male foil fencers
Olympic fencers of Mexico
Fencers at the 1968 Summer Olympics
Fencers from Mexico City
Mexican male sabre fencers
20th-century Mexican people